Revolution Saints is the eponymous debut album of the American rock supergroup Revolution Saints featuring vocalist/drummer Deen Castronovo of Journey, formerly of The Dead Daisies, Bad English, and Hardline; guitar player Doug Aldrich of The Dead Daisies and Burning Rain, formerly of Dio and Whitesnake; and vocalist/bass player Jack Blades of Night Ranger.

The album was produced by Italian multi-instrumentalist Alessandro Del Vecchio (Hardline, Silent Force, formerly of Voodoo Circle).

Track listing

Personnel
 Deen Castronovo – drums, lead & backing vocals
 Jack Blades – bass guitar, backing vocals, co-lead vocals on "Turn Back Time" and "Way to the Sun"
 Doug Aldrich – guitars

Additional personnel
 Alessandro Del Vecchio – keyboards, backing vocals, vocals on "Way to the Sun", production, mixing, mastering
 Arnel Pineda – co-lead vocals on "You're Not Alone"
 Neal Schon – guitar solo on "Way to the Sun"
 Massimo 'Defender' Moretti – additional drum fills 
 Serafino Perugino – executive producer

References

External links
Blabbermouth.net

2015 debut albums
Frontiers Records albums
Revolution Saints albums